Dirk Labudde is a German informatician and forensic scientist who teaches Germany's only course on digital forensics at Hochschule Mittweida.

Bibliography

References 

Living people
Date of birth missing (living people)
Place of birth missing (living people)
German forensic scientists
Engineers from Saxony
Year of birth missing (living people)